A triplestore or RDF store is a purpose-built database for the storage and retrieval of triples through semantic queries. A triple is a data entity composed of subject–predicate–object, like "Bob is 35" or "Bob knows Fred".

Much like a relational database, information in a triplestore is stored and retrieved via a query language. Unlike a relational database, a triplestore is optimized for the storage and retrieval of triples. In addition to queries, triples can usually be imported and exported using Resource Description Framework (RDF) and other formats.

Implementations 
Some triplestores have been built as database engines from scratch, while others have been built on top of existing commercial relational database engines (such as SQL-based) or NoSQL document-oriented database engines. Like the early development of online analytical processing (OLAP) databases, this intermediate approach allowed large and powerful database engines to be constructed for little programming effort in the initial phases of triplestore development. A difficulty with implementing triplestores over SQL is that although "triples" may thus be "stored", implementing efficient querying of a graph-based RDF model (such as mapping from SPARQL) onto SQL queries is difficult.

Related database types
Adding a name to the triple makes a "quad store" or named graph.

A graph database has a more generalized structure than a triplestore, using graph structures with nodes, edges, and properties to represent and store data. Graph databases might provide index-free adjacency, meaning every element contains a direct pointer to its adjacent elements, and no index lookups are necessary. General graph databases that can store any graph are distinct from specialized graph databases such as triplestores and network databases.

See also
 Dataspaces
 Entity–relationship model
  – The first two elements of the class-attribute-value triple (class, attribute) are pieces of some structural metadata having a defined semantic. The third element is a value, preferably from some controlled vocabulary.
 Outline of databases
 Semantic Integration
 Semantic MediaWiki — an example of subject-predicate-object support for wikis, advanced query support, and implementations by many large organizations
 SPARQL – W3C specification involving subject-predicate-object triples
 List of SPARQL implementations
 Entity–attribute–value model is a similar approach to data modeling.

References

External links 
 A list of large triplestores
 Lehigh University Benchmark (LUBM)
 How RDF Databases Differ from Other NoSQL Solutions
 W3C SPARQL Working Group was RDF Data Access Working Group
 SPARQL Query language
 SPARQL Protocol
 SPARQL 1.1 Update W3C Recommendation 21 March 2013

Types of databases
Database management systems
Database theory
Metadata
Semantic Web